The Lithic Studies Society (LSS) was founded in 1979 to advance knowledge of, and education and research in, lithic studies. The Society's members have diverse interests, spanning Palaeolithic to historic periods across many areas of the world. The Society provides a convivial forum for the exchange of ideas and information and produces. It regularly holds lectures, day meetings, conferences and field trips, publishes an annual peer-reviewed journal (Lithics) and occasional thematic volumes. Additionally the society promotes the highest standards of lithics research and reporting, and advocates and contributes to policies relevant to lithic studies.

Lithics 

Lithics is the Society's annual, peer-reviewed journal. It is devoted to publishing research which enhances our understanding of past societies through the study of stone tools. Published in the spring of each year, Lithics contains research articles, as well as shorter communications, book reviews, bibliography of recent publications relevant to lithic studies, and news of the Society's related activities.

Occasional Papers 
The society has to date published six Occasional Papers:
 1988 The Illustration of Lithic Artefacts
 1994 Stories in Stone
 1995 Lithics in Context
 1998 Stone Age Archaeology
 2001 Palaeolithic Archaeology of the Solent River
 2004 Lithics in Action

Wymer Bursary 

To commemorate John Wymer and his contribution to archaeology, the Society created the John Wymer Bursary in 2007. It is awarded annually to support any individual to further an interest in lithic-related study. The value of the bursary is presently £250.

Applications for the bursary are open to students, academics, others professionally engaged in lithic study, and those simply pursuing an interest in lithics as a hobby. The bursary may be used towards excavation expenses, fieldwork, study of collections, and participation in a conference or travel, but a case may be made for other uses. The bursary can be used to support activities in the UK or abroad.

External links 
 Lithic Studies Society
 John Wymer obituary

Archaeological professional associations
Organizations established in 1979